Josh Harris (born 3 July 1990) is an Australian long-distance runner. He competed in the men's marathon at the 2017 World Championships in Athletics. Harris has Australian records in athletics in the 25,000m and 30,000m, set in July 2016.

References

External links
 

1990 births
Living people
Australian male long-distance runners
Australian male marathon runners
World Athletics Championships athletes for Australia
Place of birth missing (living people)
21st-century Australian people